Phofo (a.k.a. Adam Weitz) is a music producer from New York (now living in Los Angeles). He is best known for composing the score for Disney's Club Penguin, Sushi Pack (a Saturday morning cartoon on CBS), the animated feature film, "Los Campeones de La Lucha Libre" (Porchlight), and Shep & Tiffany Watch TV (Bravo). Alongside MF Doom and De La Soul's Prince Paul (producer), Phofo was responsible for producing and engineering MC Paul Barman's critically acclaimed Paullelujah! LP (Coup d'État). Phofo was a contributing writer to McSweeney's "Created in Darkness by Troubled Americans" (Knopf/Random House) and a music consultant to PRI's This American Life.

References

External links
Superswell.com

American electronic musicians
Living people
Year of birth missing (living people)